Theodore Edson Chandler (December 26, 1894 – January 7, 1945) was a Rear admiral of the United States Navy during World War II, who commanded battleship and cruiser divisions in both the Atlantic and Pacific Fleets. He was killed in action when a Japanese kamikaze aircraft struck his flagship  on January 6, 1945, in Lingayen Gulf, Philippine Islands. He died the next day, January 7, 1945, from severely scorched lungs. He was one of five flag officers of the U.S. Navy to die in World War II after Isaac C. Kidd, Norman Scott, Daniel J. Callaghan, and Henry M. Mullinnix.

Early life and career
Theodore Edson Chandler was born at Annapolis, Maryland, in 1894, on the day after Christmas, the son of Rear Admiral Lloyd Horwitz Chandler, USN, and Mrs. Agatha Edson Chandler. He was the grandson of William E. Chandler (1835–1917),  who served as Secretary of the Navy during the Chester A. Arthur administration and a U.S. Senator from New Hampshire, and Lucy Lambert Hale (1841–1915).

He attended Manlius School for Boys and Swavely's Army and Navy Preparatory School before his appointment to the United States Naval Academy for the Second District of New Hampshire in 1911. As a Midshipman he won letters in basketball and lacrosse. He graduated and was commissioned an Ensign on 4 June 1915. The new officer received orders to report for duty in the battleship . Chandler next served briefly on board the battleship  before beginning training in the use of torpedoes at the end of April 1917, on board . On August 2, he completed that assignment and four days later joined the precommissioning complement of the destroyer , then being fitted out at the Philadelphia Navy Yard.

World War I and interwar years
In May 1918, Lieutenant junior grade Chandler sailed in Conner to Brest, France, his destroyer's base during the last six months of World War I. After the Armistice, his service in European waters included a brief term as the temporary commanding officer of Conner.

Chandler returned home in April 1919.  On April 28, 1919, he married Beatrice Bowen Fairfax in Washington, D.C.  In May, 1919, he reported to the shipyard of the William Cramp & Sons Shipbuilding Co. to help outfit the destroyer , named in honor of his late grandfather, former Secretary of the Navy William E. Chandler. After her commissioning in September, he served in that ship until December 1920, when he was detached to return to the United States.

On January 2, 1921, he reported for duty at the Naval Postgraduate School at Annapolis, Maryland, and began a 29-month series of ordnance-related studies. On December 26, 1922, Theodora Edson Chandler was born.  She was the only child born to Theodore and Beatrice Chandler.  On June 1, 1923, he completed training duty and, after a brief leave of absence, reported to Newport News, Virginia, on July 4 for duty in conjunction with the outfitting of the battleship . The battleship went into commission on 1 December, and Chandler served in her until 16 January 1925 when he transferred to the battleship .

In June 1926, newly promoted Lt. Comdr. Chandler came ashore once more for a two-year assignment at the Naval Mine Depot, Yorktown, Virginia. A nine-month tour of duty as gunnery officer in the light cruiser  followed. He reported on board the auxiliary vessel  on April 24, 1929, but was detached only two days later to assume command of the destroyer . In October 1930, he began another series of shore assignments, reporting initially to the Bureau of Ordnance and then to the Army Industrial College before rounding out duty ashore with a brief tour in the office of the Chief of Naval Operations.

On May 30, 1932, Chandler resumed sea duty as gunnery officer on the staff of the Commander Destroyers Battle Force. On February 2, 1934, he assumed command of the destroyer . Between August 1935 and June 1938, he served three successive tours as assistant naval attaché: first at Paris, then at Madrid, and finally at Lisbon.

He arrived in Camden, New Jersey, in June 1938 to help fit out the light cruiser ; and he served as her executive officer until July 1940. Next, he returned to Washington, D.C. for a 15-month assignment in the office of the Chief of Naval Operations. Near the end of that tour of duty, he was promoted to captain on July 18, 1941.

World War II

Atlantic campaigns
Chandler relieved Capt. P. P. Powell as commanding officer of the light cruiser  on October 15. Shortly over three weeks later, an event occurred that highlighted Chandler's tour in command of the light cruiser.

On the morning of November 6, 1941, Omaha, in company with the destroyer , came across a darkened ship that acted suspiciously when challenged. That ship—although bearing the name Willmoto and purportedly operating out of Philadelphia—proved to be the German blockade runner Odenwald, bound for Germany with 3,857 metric tons of raw rubber in her holds. Scuttled by her crew, the German ship began to sink; but Capt. Chandler sent a party onto the German vessel that controlled the flooding and salvaged the ship. This was the last occasion on which American sailors received prize money.

For most of the next 18 months, Omaha cruised the waters of the South Atlantic in search of German blockade runners and submarines. That tour of duty ended in April 1943, when Chandler was selected to command United States naval forces in the Aruba-Curaçao area. On May 3, 1944, he was promoted to rear admiral. In July 1944, Rear Admiral Chandler took command of Cruiser Division 2 (CruDiv 2), Atlantic Fleet. In that capacity, he participated in Operation Dragoon, the invasion of southern France in mid-August, and commanded the "Sitka-Romeo" force which captured the Iles d'Hyeres just off the coast of Provence.

Pacific campaigns
Shortly thereafter, Rear Admiral Chandler was given command of Battleship Division 2 (BatDiv 2) of the Pacific Fleet.

He reported for duty on October 2 in time to command his ships—part of Rear Admiral Jesse B. Oldendorf's bombardment group—during the Leyte invasion and helped to repulse the Japanese southern attack group—Vice Admirals Shoji Nishimura's Force "C" and Kiyohide Shima's 2d Striking Force—in the Surigao Strait phase of the Battle for Leyte Gulf.

On December 8, 1944, Rear Admiral Chandler was shifted to command of CruDiv 4 and flew his flag above . During the voyage from Leyte to Lingayen for the invasion of Luzon, Chandler's cruisers came under heavy Japanese air attacks—mostly by kamikazes.

Late in the afternoon of January 5, 1945, a group of sixteen kamikazes swooped in on the force then about 100 miles (200 km) from Manila Bay. One of the four successful kamikazes crashed into Rear Admiral Chandler's flagship  at her number No. 2 main battery 8-inch 55 caliber gun, putting it out of commission, but continued her bombarding mission and downed several planes. On January 6, 1945, the cruiser suffered more severely during a second attack. At 17:30, another kamikaze plunged into the cruiser's starboard side at the signal bridge, where explosives wrought havoc. Rear Admiral Chandler jumped from the bridge to the signal bridge though horribly burned by gasoline flames, Chandler helped deploy fire hoses alongside enlisted men to stop the flames and then waited his turn for first aid with those same ratings. The admiral, his lungs scorched very severely, was beyond help. He died the next day, January 7, 1945, in spite of the efforts of the medical department.  Chandler was posthumously awarded a Navy Cross (for Lingayen Gulf), a Silver Star (for Surigao Strait) and an Army Distinguished Service Medal (from General Douglas MacArthur) Admiral Chandler was buried at sea, and is listed on the Tablets of the Missing at the Manila Philippines National Cemetery.

Namesakes
Two ships in the U.S. Navy have been named after Chandler.  In October 1945, the destroyer  was named in his honor.  In 1983, the  guided missile destroyer  was named after him.

References
Citations

Websites
 
 

Books
 
 Anon (1946). Man of War: Log of the United States Heavy Cruiser Louisville. Philadelphia: Dunlap Printing Co.
 Morison, Samuel, Eliot, The Liberation of the Philippines: Luzon, Mindanao, the Visayas 1944-45, (2001) New York, Castle Books for Little Brown and Company

External links
  – cenotaph at Arlington National cemetery
  – Tablets of the Missing

1894 births
1945 deaths
United States Navy personnel killed in World War II
Naval Postgraduate School alumni
People from Annapolis, Maryland
Military personnel from Maryland
Recipients of the Distinguished Service Medal (US Army)
Recipients of the Navy Cross (United States)
Recipients of the Silver Star
United States Naval Academy alumni
United States Navy rear admirals
United States Navy World War II admirals